Blackbird Leys is a civil parish and ward in Oxford, England. According to the 2011 census, the population of the ward (whose boundaries may change occasionally so as to ensure minimal malapportionment) stood at 6,077. Unlike most parts of the City of Oxford, the area has a civil parish, which was created in 1990. In 2011 the population was recorded as 13,100.

History

Early history
There was a Bronze Age or Iron Age settlement on the site. Evidence has been found suggesting pits and roundhouses, with remains of pottery and a cylindrical loom weight of a kind previously known only from East Anglia. The area was originally called Blackford Leys; blackford after the dark-coloured ford which crossed the southern branch of Northfield Brook at the entrance to Blackbird Leys farm. The ford would be located where Windale Avenue crosses Northfield Brook. The farm was also called Blackford Leys farm. The Middle English leys meaning pasture or meadow.

Modern history

The Blackbird Leys Estate was built mainly in the 1950s and 1960s to meet the then pressing need for housing. It was part of a plan to re-house people from the dilapidated inner city. This included large-scale clearance of a site near to where the Oxford Ice Rink was built (The Oxpens). Many of the families that moved onto the estate originally came from this area. It was also a convenient site for factory workers at the Morris Motors Limited plant in nearby Cowley.

Politics
The area has traditionally been staunchly Labour. The Independent Working Class Association performed strongly in the mid-2000s, holding three of the four council seats on Oxford City Council between 2006 and 2008. Andrew Smith, the local MP from 1987 to 2017, lives on the estate. His late wife, Valerie Smith, was also a city councillor and county councillor for the area and former Lord Mayor of Oxford.

In stark contrast to Oxford as a whole, which had a Remain result of 71% in the 2016 UK referendum on EU membership, Blackbird Leys and neighbouring estates voted narrowly to leave the European Union.

1991 street disturbances
Around 1991, Blackbird Leys suffered from joy riding. Young men from the estate would steal cars and 'display' them (with a variety of high-speed stunts) to an audience gathered outside the estate shops (known locally as the 'top shops'). Following a crackdown by police on joyriding in September 1991, some 150 youths stoned police officers. Two women suffered stab wounds and two men suffered other injuries during the riots.  Local MP, Andrew Smith, stated in 1991 that the extensive national media coverage of confrontations with the police in August and September left the wider public with a distorted picture of the problem. Some say journalists visiting helped encourage some of the action for filming.

Crime levels have decreased consistently since 2004, a change thought to be due to a higher police presence on the estate, though both recorded crime and rates found in the British Crime Survey have fallen across England and Wales.

Facilities

Sports and leisure

The Kassam Stadium is the home of Oxford United Football Club and is just within the greater boundary of Blackbird Leys in an area known as Minchery Farm. Initial construction begun in 1996 and the first football match took place on 4 August 2001.

Musical groups
In 2006, residents from the estate took part in The Singing Estate, a Channel Five reality TV show following their progress from amateur singers to classical choir. The Blackbird Leys Choir emerged from the original choir and continues today.

Education
Schools on the estate include Pegasus First School, Windale Community Primary School and Northfield School. City of Oxford College has a campus situated on Cuddesdon Way which provides further education, higher education, modern apprenticeships and community evening classes.

Transport
Blackbird Leys has no mainline railway station but is served by Oxford Bus Company and Stagecoach in Oxfordshire which provides bus services between Blackbird Leys, central Oxford and Oxford railway station. The freight-only railway between Kennington Junction and the BMW Mini factory via Iffley and Littlemore forms the northwestern boundary of Blackbird Leys. It is part of the former Wycombe Railway that British Railways closed to passenger traffic in 1963.

Religious sites
Blackbird Leys has two places of worship, The Church of the Holy Family which was dedicated on 10 April 1965 and Sacred Heart Catholic Church.

In Popular Culture 
Blackbird Leys figures prominently in the song of the same name by New York City band Glenarvon.

See also
Banlieue
Littlemore Brook, which flows from Blackbird Leys and through the Oxford Science Park to the south.

Footnotes

References

External links
BBC Oxford
Municipal Dreams Estate Appraisal

Areas of Oxford
Housing estates in Oxfordshire
Civil parishes in Oxfordshire